Since 1 January 2017, the Pyrénées-Orientales department has had twelve public establishments for intercommunal cooperation (EPCI), each with their administrative seats being located in the department and having their own tax systems.

Intercommunalities with their own taxation

Current

Former structures for intercommunal cooperation

Historic evolution of intercommunal structures

In 2007 

 1 January 2007: Creation of the communauté de communes des Albères et de la Côte Vermeille from the communauté de communes des Albères and the communauté de communes de la Côte Vermeille.

In 2011 

 1 January 2011: Disbandment of the communauté de communes du Rivesaltais-Agly-Manadeil into the communauté d'agglomération Perpignan Méditerranée.

In 2014 

 1 January 2014: Disbandment of the communauté de communes Canigou - Val Cady into the communauté de communes du Conflent.
 1 January 2014: Disbandment of the communauté de communes du secteur d'Illibéris into the communauté de communes des Albères et de la Côte Vermeille.

In 2015 

 1 January 2015: Creation of the communauté de communes Conflent Canigó from the communauté de communes Vinça Canigou, communauté de communes du Conflent, and the commune of Marquixanes.

In 2016 

 The communauté d'agglomération Perpignan Méditerranée becomes a communauté urbaine and changes its name to become the communauté urbaine Perpignan Méditerranée Métropole.
 The communauté de communes Capcir Haut-Conflent changes its name to become the communauté de communes Pyrénées catalanes.

References

External links 

Intercommunalities of the Pyrenees-Orientales department
Intercommunalities of Pyrénées-Orientales
Pyrenees-Orientales